When Pigs Fly is a solo album by Brian Vollmer, lead vocalist of the Canadian heavy metal band Helix.  It was released in 1999 and features ex-Helix and current Saga/My Wicked Twin drummer Brian Doerner.  It was released under the band name Vollmer and is Brian Vollmer's only solo release to date.  It was Vollmer's first studio album since Helix's 1993 release It's a Business Doing Pleasure.  There would be a five-year gap between When Pigs Fly and Vollmer's next studio release, Helix's Rockin' in My Outer Space from 2004.

Track listing
 "I'm a Live Frankenstein"
 "Life of the Party (But Now He's Dead!!)"
 "King of the Hill"
 "Stumblin' Blind"
 "Pissed Off"
 "X-Ray Eyes"
 "F.u.g.l.y."
 "When Pigs Fly"
 "Good Times Don't Get Better Than This"

Track 1 was later released in remixed and overdubbed form on the Helix CD Never Trust Anyone Over 30.
Tracks 3 and 4 were later released in remixed and overdubbed forms on the Helix CD Rockin' in My Outer Space.  
Track 9 was later used as end credit music on the Helix DVD 30 Years of Helix.

Credits
Executive Producer:  Brian Vollmer
Produced by Dan Brodbeck
Engineered by Dan Burns
Recorded at DB Studios, London, Ontario Canada.

Vollmer
Brian Vollmer - lead vocals
Bill Gadd - lead guitar
Tony Palleschi - bass guitar
Brian Doerner - drums

Additional Musicians
Christine Newland - cello on track 4
Mel Martin - violin on track 4

Videos
"I'm A Live Frankenstein" was filmed and released as a music video.  Ray Lyell directed the video.  This video was eventually released for sale on VHS.

References

Helix (band) albums
1990 albums